Lake Rangrim, also known as Lake Nangnim, is an artificial lake in the Rangrim Mountains of Chagang Province in northern North Korea. It was formed by damming a river valley to produce hydroelectricity. The lake, with its adjacent temperate broadleaf and mixed forest habitats, has been identified by BirdLife International as an  Important Bird Area (IBA).

References

Important Bird Areas of North Korea
Chagang Province
Rangrim